Sunetta is a genus of bivalves belonging to the family Veneridae.

The species of this genus are found in Old World and Australia.

Species
Species:

Sunetta adelinae 
Sunetta beni 
Sunetta bruggeni 
Sunetta concinna 
Sunetta crassatelliformis 
Sunetta cumingii 
Sunetta donacina 
Sunetta effossa 
Sunetta kirai 
Sunetta langfordi 
Sunetta menstrualis 
Sunetta meroe 
Sunetta nomurai 
Sunetta ovalis 
Sunetta scripta 
Sunetta solanderii 
Sunetta subquadrata 
Sunetta sunettina 
Sunetta vaginalis

References

Veneridae
Bivalve genera